Mirowo  is a village in the administrative district of Gmina Nowy Staw, within Malbork County, Pomeranian Voivodeship, in northern Poland.

Before 1772 the area was part of Kingdom of Poland, 1772–1919 Prussia and Germany, 1920–1939 Free City of Danzig, September 1939 – February 1945 Nazi Germany. In 1945 returned to Poland. For the history of the region, see History of Pomerania.

The village has a population of 66.

References

Mirowo